The Evangelical College of Theology (TECT) is a Christian educational establishment in Sierra Leone, whose mission is to "Preach the Word, Reach the World."  The college offers certificate, diplomas, bachelor degree and Master degree programs. Enrolment for the 2017-18school year was 800 students.  The college operates at four locations: the main campus in Jui, the Freetown Extension site, and the Makeni and Bo Distance Education sites.

TECT is partnered with the Global Connection Partnership Network, Overseas Council International, and the European Baptist Mission. These organizations provide short term and long term supportive staff to the college. For the 2012-13 school year, the campus has 37 Sierra Leonean staff and faculty members, with 4 American staff and faculty members in lecturer or administrative support roles.
The College is one of the leading Tertiary Institution in Sierra Leone, the college administration ensures that students are always well dressed and are decent and presentable. The college have a spacious 27 acres campus at Jui, the college also have a library stocked with 60,000 books and an online library with over 160,000 books. All the lecture rooms in the Campus are air-conditioned with ultra modern facility and free internet access and a well stocked computer lab.

History
In 1957, an Inter-Missions Bible School Committee was formed by four Christian denominations in Sierra Leone:  The Missionary Church of Africa (MCA), United Brethren in Christ (UBC), and the American Wesleyan Methodist Church (AWM) now called the Wesleyan Church of Sierra Leone. This committee formed from the identified need for training pastors and administrators for the Christian churches of Sierra Leone.

During the transition from colonial rule which was finalized in 1961, the committee requested from British government to obtain land for a campus. The British government granted the land and buildings of a former military barracks located on the Jui Peninsula 10 miles east of Freetown, Sierra Leone’s capital city.

On October 12, 1964, the Sierra Leone Bible College was founded and begun offering both diploma and bachelor’s level degrees.

The campus was initially led and run by western missionaries, predominantly from the United States. The missionaries, and their sending denominations, provided funding for all the operations of the campus.

During this time, the enrolment year to year varied between ten and thirty students.

In 1979, the Baptist Convention of Sierra Leone was added as a proprietary body.

In 1998, the Countess of Huntington Connexion was added as a proprietary body and the Missionary Church of Africa (MCA) withdrew its proprietorship.

In 1999, the campus officially changed its name to The Evangelical College of Theology (TECT).

During the Civil War
When the civil war escalated in the 1990s, the western missionary leadership of the college gathered several alumni who were then in positions of church leadership in Sierra Leone.  The missionaries informed the Sierra Leoneans that they were withdrawing both their personnel and financial support of the campus and handed full leadership to the Sierra Leoneans.

This presented a challenge to the new national leadership. Enrolment and tuition of ten to thirty students each year did not financially provide for the needs and upkeep of the campus.  As a result, additional programs were initiated and the enrolment was grown from thirty to over 200 students each semester at the main campus in Jui outside of Freetown.

Current programs
TECT now offers diplomas and degrees in the following areas:

Degrees
 Masters in Theology
 Masters in Global Leadership
 Bachelor of Theology (with majors in Missions, Pastoral Studies and Christian Education)
 Bachelor of Adult Education
 Bachelor in Peace & Development Studies
 Bachelor in Community Development Studies
Bachelor in Business Administration (With Majors in Banking and Finance, and Marketing)

Diplomas
 Theology
 Christian Ministry
 Community Development Studies
 Peace & Conflict Studies
 Public Administration
 Business Administration

References

Protestant seminaries and theological colleges
Universities and colleges in Sierra Leone